Korea Financial Telecommunications and Clearings Institute (KFTC) is a non-profit organization which manages several inter-bank payment systems in South Korea.

Business 
 Check clearing
Cashier's check truncation
Local L/C clearing
Corporate purchasing fund bill truncation
Electronic bonds
Management of dishonored bills
 Giro
Paper based giro (bill)
Electronic giro (Direct Debit / Direct Credit), similar to an automatic clearing house
Internet giro (electronic bill payment)
 Inter-bank network
CD/ATM network
IFT Network (Inter-bank Fund Transfer Network)
HOFINET (Inter-bank Home/Firm Banking Network)
K-Cash Network (Electronic Money Network)
CLS Network (and SWIFT Representative Office in Korea)
 Bank Joint Electronic Services
Accredited certification for internet/mobile banking (PKI-based)
KF-ISAC (Information Sharing and Analysis Center)
Retirement pension record-keeping

External links 
KFTC homepage (in English)

Interbank networks
Non-profit organizations based in South Korea
Financial services companies of South Korea